Alain Patritti (born 15 July 1953) is a French racing cyclist. He rode in the 1978 Tour de France.

References

1953 births
Living people
French male cyclists
Place of birth missing (living people)